Sardar Bahadur Sir Sundar Singh Majithia  (17 February 1872 – 2 April 1941) was a Punjabi landowner and politician.

Biography
He was born to an aristocratic Sher-Gill Jat Sikh family, the son of Raja Surat Singh of Majitha. He was educated at Aitchison College, and Government College, in Lahore.

One of the largest landowners in the Punjab, he was also honorary secretary of the Chief Khalsa Diwan, the representative body of the Sikh community in British India, from its formation in 1902 until 1920. He was a supporter of British rule in India, opposed to the activities of the Ghadar Party and served on various bodies appointed by the Viceroy. He was appointed Companion of the Order of the Indian Empire (CIE) in the 1920 New Year Honours and was knighted in 1926.

He served as Revenue Member at the first and second legislative councils of the Punjab Legislative Assembly in 1921 and 1926. Following the Unionist victory in the 1937 Indian provincial elections, Sir Sikandar Hayat Khan promoted him to the cabinet of his new ministry as Revenue Member. He remained in the position until his death in 1941.

He played a leading part in forming the conservative and loyalist Khalsa Nationalist Party and was a significant contributor to the Singh Sabha Movement.

He allegedly invited Reginald Dyer to his house for dinner on the evening after the Jallianwala Bagh massacre, even though he was aware what had taken place.

Personal life
He had two sons, one of which was Surjit Singh Majithia. He was also the great-grandfather of Bikram Singh Majithia. His niece was the artist Amrita Sher-Gil.

See also
 Majithia Sirdars

References

1872 births
1941 deaths
Aitchison College alumni
Knights Bachelor
Indian Knights Bachelor
Companions of the Order of the Indian Empire
Indian Sikhs
Administrators in British India
People from British India
Indian politicians
Sardar Bahadurs